The 2005 Slovak Figure Skating Championships were held in Ružomberok from December 17 through 19, 2004. Skaters competed in the disciplines of men's singles, ladies' singles, pair skating, and ice dancing on the senior level.

Results

Men

Ladies

Pairs

Ice dancing

External links
 results

2004 in figure skating
Slovak Figure Skating Championships, 2005
Slovak Figure Skating Championships
2004 in Slovak sport